Steyerbromelia (named after Julian A. Steyermark, an American plant collector, author, and editor) is a genus of plants in the family Bromeliaceae, subfamily Navioideae. All the known species in the genus are endemic to southern Venezuela, and northern Brazil and Colombia.

Species 
Steyerbromelia deflexa L.B. Smith & Robinson 
Steyerbromelia diffusa L.B. Smith, Steyermark & Robinson 
Steyerbromelia discolor L.B. Smith & Robinson 
Steyerbromelia plowmanii (L.B. Smith, Steyermark & Robinson) Robinson & D. Taylor 
Steyerbromelia ramosa (L.B. Smith) B. Holst 
Steyerbromelia thomasii (L.B. Smith, Steyermark & Robinson) B. Holst

Kew also accepts;

References

External links
BSI Genera Gallery photos

 
Bromeliaceae genera
Endemic flora of Venezuela
Plants described in 1987
Flora of North Brazil
Flora of Colombia